"We Must Be Doin' Somethin' Right" is a song co-written and recorded by American country music artist Eddie Rabbitt.  It was released in October 1988 as the third single from the album I Wanna Dance with You.  The song reached number 7 on the Billboard Hot Country Singles & Tracks chart.  It was written by Rabbitt and Reed Nielsen.

Chart performance

References

1989 singles
Eddie Rabbitt songs
Songs written by Eddie Rabbitt
Song recordings produced by Richard Landis
RCA Records singles
Songs written by Reed Nielsen
1988 songs